Carlence "Keith" Marquis Mitchell (born July 24, 1974) is a former American football linebacker in the National Football League who played for the New Orleans Saints, the Houston Texans and the Jacksonville Jaguars between 1997 and 2003.

High school and college
Mitchell attended Lakeview High School in Garland, Texas and went to an outstanding college career at Texas A&M, where he was part of a star-studded defense known as the "Wrecking Crew". He was a talented pass rusher who was among the NCAA leaders in quarterback sacks during his junior and senior years. He had 34 career sacks for the Aggies and 18.5 career tackles behind the line of scrimmage. As a senior, Mitchell had 14.5 sacks and 10.5 other tackles for loss. Although constantly double-teamed, he still managed 50 solo tackles as a senior. Mitchell was the defensive MVP of the Aggies' 1995 Alamo Bowl victory over Michigan. He was named to The Sporting News college All-America second-team and to the first-team College Football News All-American team as an outside linebacker in 1996.

NFL
In spite of his collegiate success, Mitchell was not selected in the NFL draft because of concerns over his lack of bulk and ineffectiveness in coverage. He was signed by the New Orleans Saints and found immediate success with that club, appearing in 79 consecutive games during 5 seasons with the team, and making 60 starts over his final 4 seasons (in which he averaged 93 tackles and 4 sacks). His Saints career was highlighted by a 2000 season where he recorded 6.5 sacks, had 2 defensive touchdown returns, and was named to the Pro Bowl.

His success with the Saints was based largely on the fact that former defensive coordinator Ron Zook played to Mitchell's strengths and employed three down linemen with an outside linebacker (usually Mitchell) lining up as a defensive end. Mitchell's role had been similar as a college player, where he saw most of his success utilizing his great speed as a blitzing outside linebacker.

In 2001, Charlie Clemons replaced Mitchell as the Saints' rush end linebacker, producing a team-leading 13.5 sacks and an interception.  Mitchell recorded only two sacks that year. Mitchell asked for his release following the 2001 season, and was signed by the Houston Texans. Mitchell started 7 consecutive games for the Texans in 2002, but his playing time was limited as a result of injuries, and he did not appear in a game after November 17 of that year. He was signed as an unrestricted free agent in March 2003 by the Jacksonville Jaguars and started for the Jags first two games of the 2003 season, his last in the NFL, but was injured and only appeared in one game for the remainder of the season.

NFL statistics

References

External links
Texas A&M All-Americans
KFFL Article
KFFL page
New Orleans Saints Article

1974 births
Living people
People from Garland, Texas
American football linebackers
Texas A&M Aggies football players
New Orleans Saints players
Houston Texans players
Jacksonville Jaguars players
National Conference Pro Bowl players